Gymnopilus flavidellus is a species of mushroom in the family Hymenogastraceae.

Description

Habitat and distribution
Gymnopilus flavidellus grows on coniferous and deciduous wood, such as stumps, buried wood, fallen limbs, and sawdust. It can be found in most of temperate North America, fruiting from autumn to winter.

See also

List of Gymnopilus species

References

External links
Gymnopilus flavidellus at Index Fungorum

flavidellus
Fungi of North America
Taxa named by William Alphonso Murrill